The Jamrud Fort is located beside Bab-e-Khyber at the entrance to the Khyber Pass from the Peshawar side in the tribal district of Khyber KPK, Pakistan.
After death of Sardar General Hari Singh Nalwa, 
Khalsa Sarkar Wazir Jawahar Singh nominated Sardar General Gurmukh Singh Lamba as chief administrative and military commander to restore and consolidate the Khalsa army gains.
General Sardar Gurmukh Singh Lamba was nominated as chief administrative and military commander to consolidate the gains of Khalsa Sarkar.

History
In October 1836, Jamrud was lost by the Afghan Durrani Empire and conquered by the Sikh Empire. Sardar Hari Singh Nalwa (1791-1837), the well-known Sikh general, proposed to build a big fort at Jamrud. The proposal was opposed; nevertheless the foundation of the fort that has survived was laid by General Hari Singh Nalwa on 6 Poh 1893 Sambat (18 December 1836) and the construction was completed in 54 days. "Jamrud...noted for its fort built with 10 feet (3 m) thick walls c.1836 by the Sikh Hari Singh Nalwa, one of Ranjit Singh's generals, was originally named Fatehgarh to commemorate the Sikh victory over the disunited tribes."

Early in 1837, the Sandhawalia Jat ruler Maharaja Ranjit Singh's (1790-1839) grandson, Prince Nau Nihal Singh, was to be married. Hari Singh Nalwa sent his forces to Lahore for this historic celebration. At this time, Mr Fast, an Englishman, previously in the service of the British India Government, passed through Jamrud on his way to Kabul. En route he encountered Mohammad Akbar Khan, son of Dost Mohammad Khan. When Akbar Khan learnt that the fort at Jamrud was unprotected, he decided to attack. The battle between the Afghans and the Sikhs was fought on 30 April 1837. The loss suffered in this battle by the Sikhs was indeed heavy. Hari Singh Nalwa had sent out an appeal for help to the Maharaja to dispatch reinforcements from Lahore post haste, however his letter was not forwarded to the Maharaja by the Dogra chiefs. Reinforcements could not reach in time and Nalwa laid down his life in the battlefield. When the reinforcements arrived, the Sikhs managed to hold the fort and force the Afghan forces to retreat back to Kabul.

See also

List of UNESCO World Heritage Sites in Pakistan
List of forts in Pakistan
List of museums in Pakistan

References

Forts in Khyber Pakhtunkhwa
Cultural heritage sites in Khyber Pakhtunkhwa